Sir Richard Wrottesley, 7th Baronet (19 June 1721 – 20 July 1769) of Wrottesley Hall in Staffordshire, was a Member of Parliament, Anglican clergyman and Dean of Worcester.

Biography
He was born a younger son of Sir John Wrottesley, 4th Bt., MP, by Frances, the daughter of the Hon. John Grey, MP of Enville and educated at Winchester School (1736–38) and St. John's College, Oxford (1739), later transferring to Queens' College, Cambridge. 
He succeeded his elder brother Sir Walter Wrottesley as baronet in 1732.

It is said that when Bonny Prince Charlie was marching south through England during the course of his rebellion, Sir Richard, a regular duellist, armed his tenants and gathered his servants to do battle but he reportedly never got further than a local inn, The Bull at Codsall, where his small team of men spent a convivial week.

He became M.P. for Tavistock in December 1747, holding the seat until 1754. He was appointed a Clerk of the Green Cloth from 1749 to 1754.

He became a Church official, being appointed minister of St Michael's in Tettenhall. He was appointed chaplain in ordinary to the King, George III, in 1763 and collated Dean of Worcester for life in 1765.

He married Lady Mary Leveson-Gower, the daughter of John Leveson-Gower, 1st Earl Gower and Evelyn Pierrepont, in 1739. They had five daughters.

He died in 1769.

See also
 Baron Wrottesley, and The Wrottesley Baronetcy

References

1721 births
1769 deaths
Baronets in the Baronetage of England
Deans of Worcester
Members of the Parliament of Great Britain for Tavistock
British MPs 1747–1754
Alumni of Queens' College, Cambridge